The Compilation of Final Fantasy VII is a metaseries produced by Square Enix. A subseries stemming from the main Final Fantasy franchise, it is a collection of video games, animated features and short stories set in the world and continuity of Final Fantasy VII (1997). Officially announced in 2003 with the reveal of Final Fantasy VII: Advent Children, the series' core products are four video games and one movie release. Alongside these are tie-in products and spin-offs including books, mobile games and an original video animation. Advent Children and the mobile title Before Crisis: Final Fantasy VII are a sequel and prequel to VII, respectively focusing on Cloud Strife, the original game's main protagonist, and covert operatives known as the Turks. Crisis Core: Final Fantasy VII follows Zack Fair, a minor character in VII, while Dirge of Cerberus: Final Fantasy VII, a sequel to Advent Children, follows Vincent Valentine, one of the original's optional characters.

The series was conceived by Yoshinori Kitase, the original game's director, and Tetsuya Nomura, the main character designer. Nomura would become the main designer for each entry in the Compilation. Other returning staff include writer Kazushige Nojima, art director Yusuke Naora, and composer Nobuo Uematsu. The video games belong to different genres, with none of them being traditional role-playing games due to production pressures related to the genre. While the first title revealed was Advent Children, it ran into delays during post-production, so the first Compilation title to be released was the mobile game Before Crisis.

Of the core titles, Before Crisis is the only one still unreleased in the west due to issues with overseas platform compatibility and staff changes. Reception of titles in the Compilation has been mixed, with Advent Children being praised for its visuals and criticized for its confusing nature. Before Crisis and Crisis Core have received praise, while Dirge of Cerberus garnered a mixed response. The presentation of the Compilation as a whole has met with a mixed response, and later staff linked it to the decline of the Final Fantasy series' prestige in the West. The Compilation inspired the creation of Fabula Nova Crystallis Final Fantasy, a similar subseries of linked video games.

Titles

Video games
 Before Crisis: Final Fantasy VII is an action role-playing video game split into 24 episodes, with episode delivery working via a monthly subscription-based distribution system. After going through beta testing in 2004, it was released on September 24, 2004 for NTT DoCoMo's FOMA iMode, and on January 30 and April 5, 2007 for SoftBank Mobile and EZweb respectively. The game was never released to western markets, despite plans to do so.
 Dirge of Cerberus: Final Fantasy VII is an action game featuring both first and third-person shooter elements. There was originally a multiplayer mode, but this was removed in the western version. It was released on January 26, August 15, and November 17, 2006 in Japan, North America and Europe respectively. The localized version received an overhaul before release, as the developers were not pleased with the Japanese version of the game. An International version, featuring the improvements made to the localized version, was released in Japan on September 11, 2008 as part of Square Enix's Ultimate Hits lineup. A mobile spin-off taking place during the events of the game, Dirge of Cerberus Lost Episode: Final Fantasy VII, was released on August 22, 2006 in North America and July 26, 2007 in Japan.
 Crisis Core: Final Fantasy VII is an action role-playing game. Crisis Core has the player controlling Zack Fair in a real-time combat system enabling the player to move Zack around, activate abilities and attack or block attacks from enemies. It was released on September 13, 2007 in Japan, and on March 24 and June 20, 2008 in North America and Europe respectively. A remaster of the game, Crisis Core: Final Fantasy VII Reunion, released in late 2022, for Microsoft Windows, Nintendo Switch, PlayStation 4, PlayStation 5, Xbox One, Xbox Series X/S.
 Final Fantasy VII Remake is an action role-playing game developed and published by Square Enix, released for PlayStation 4 on April 10, 2020. It is the first in a planned trilogy of sequels following the 1997 original. An expanded edition, Final Fantasy VII Remake Intergrade, was released for PlayStation 5 in June 2021.
 Final Fantasy VII: The First Soldier is a free-to-play battle royale multiplayer game for mobile phones released on November 17, 2021. Developed by Ateam Inc. and published by Square Enix, the game is set 30 years before the events of Final Fantasy VII. The First Soldier follows SOLDIER candidates and the establishment of SOLDIER by the Shinra Electric Power Company to bolster their military. The game's battles are set in a virtual reality recreation of Midgar, similar to the Virtual Reality System and Shinra Combat Simulator. Its gameplay features 3 versus 3 multiplayer arena matches, blending action elements traditional to the genre with RPG mechanics and Final Fantasy gameplay elements. Due to the nature of the gameplay, there is not much narrative element, but the setting and lore is incorporated into the game. Despite fairly regular updates, the game was shut down on January 11, 2023.
 Final Fantasy VII: Ever Crisis is a role-playing video game. Scheduled for release in 2023 for iOS and Android, it is an episodic single-player game which retells the events of the canon Compilation titles while adding in new narrative material.
 Final Fantasy VII Rebirth is an action role-playing game developed and published by Square Enix, set to be released for PlayStation 5 late 2023–early 2024. The game is the second installment in the Remake trilogy, while also being made to stand on its own.

Films
 Final Fantasy VII: Advent Children, the first title conceived for the Compilation, the second to be released, and a direct-to-DVD sequel to VII. It was released in Japan on September 14, 2005, and on April 24 and 25, 2006 for Europe and North America respectively. It received a single special western cinema screening on April 3, 2006, at the Arclight Theatre in Los Angeles. A director's cut of the film, Advent Children Complete, was also produced, featuring graphical retouches, extra footage and rerecorded voice work for the English and Japanese versions. Advent Children Complete was released as a Blu-ray exclusive in 2009 in North America (June 2), in Europe (July 27), and in Australia (October 7). A demo for Final Fantasy XIII was included in the Japanese limited edition set.
 Last Order: Final Fantasy VII, an original video animation detailing the destruction of the town of Nibelheim, a key event in VII. Last Order was packaged with a limited edition of Advent Children called Advent Pieces, released on September 14, 2005 in Japan and February 6, 2007 in North America. Advent Pieces was limited to a quantity of 77,777 copies. The OVA is no longer available to purchase. With the release of Remake, Last Order was removed from the official Compilation listing.

Related media
Multiple pieces of tie-in media have been created for the Compilation, nearly all relating to Advent Children. To promote Advent Children Complete, a series of short stories were written by Kazushige Nojima under the umbrella title On a Way to Smile. The stories were later collected into a single paperback volume and released on April 16, 2009. An animated adaptation of one story, "Case of Denzel", was included in all copies of Advent Children Complete. Nojima also wrote Final Fantasy VII Lateral Biography: Turks ~The Kids Are Alright~, a novel set a short time before Advent Children. The novel was illustrated by Shou Tojima.

A mobile racing game based on a mini game from VII, Final Fantasy VII G-Bike, was released on October 30, 2014, for iOS and Android. A western release for the title was planned. It was developed by Japan-based developer CyberConnect2 as part of a planned subseries of mobile games based on VIIs mini games. While related to VII and the Compilation due to its nature, the developers confirmed that it was not related to nor affected the Compilation itself. Due to difficulties delivering continual satisfactory service, G-Bike was shut down in 2015 without seeing a Western release.

Setting

The setting of Final Fantasy VII is a world that has been described as an industrial or post-industrial science fiction milieu. It is referred to as "the Planet" by the series characters, and was retroactively named "Gaia" in some Square Enix promotional material and by game staff. The planet's lifeforce is called the Lifestream, a flow of spiritual energy that gives life to everything on the Planet. Its processed form is known as "Mako". During VII and its prequels, the Lifestream is being used by the megacorporation Shinra as an energy source. This is in turn causing the Planet to dangerously weaken, threatening the existence of everything and everyone on the planet. The main narrative of VII focuses on an eco-terrorist group known as AVALANCHE, chronicling their conflict with Shinra president Rufus Shinra and his subordinates, including the covert Turks, and SOLDIER, an elite fighting force created by giving humans raw Mako. Eventually, all come under threat from Sephiroth, a member of SOLDIER created through Shinra experimentation and driven mad when he learns the truth about his origins, and Jenova, an alien lifeform which seeks to destroy all life on the Planet. Among the main characters are Cloud Strife, a mercenary and self-proclaimed ex-SOLDIER, Aerith Gainsborough, a flower seller and last member of an ancient tribe known as the Cetra, Tifa Lockhart, Cloud's childhood friend, and Vincent Valentine, a former Turk who was made immortal by Shinra experimentation. During the conflict, Sephiroth summons a destructive spell called Meteor to mortally wound the Planet. When Aerith attempts to summon Holy, a defense mechanism that can stop Meteor, she is killed by Sephiroth. Eventually, the party are successful in defeating Sephiroth, and the Lifestream reinforces Holy, successfully stopping Meteor.

The Compilation titles act as continuations and expansions on the core narrative, with them focusing on various characters. Advent Children begins two years after VII, when people across the world are succumbing to a disease called Geostigma and Cloud, suffering from guilt, is forced to confront Kadaj, Loz and Yazoo, avatars of Sephiroth's will. Before Crisis begins six years prior to the events of VII, and follows the confrontations between the Turks and the original incarnation of AVALANCHE. Crisis Core takes place in a similar time period, but follows events from the point of view of Zack, a SOLDIER who befriended Cloud and was killed by Shinra troops after turning against the company. Among the characters who interact with Zack is Genesis Rhapsodos, a member of SOLDIER who successfully rebels and eventually decides to protect the Planet. Dirge of Cerberus is set a year after Advent Children, and focuses on Vincent's conflict against Deepground, a sect of SOLDIER that was trapped beneath the city of Midgar during Meteor's descent. Last Order takes place during the events at Nibelheim, where Jenova was originally stored and Sephiroth first found out about himself.

Production

Creation

The Compilation of Final Fantasy VII was created by Yoshinori Kitase and Tetsuya Nomura, the respective director and character designer for Final Fantasy VII. It was at one point defined by Square Enix as their first step towards "polymorphic content", a marketing and sales strategy to "[provide] well-known properties on several platforms, allowing exposure of the products to as wide an audience as possible". Speaking on why VII had been chosen for such a project, Kitase explained that the ending left far more development opportunities open for characters and setting than other games in the series. There was also a strong financial benefit to creating the Compilation—following the unprecedented financial upturn prompted by the release of Final Fantasy X-2 just prior to the 2003 merger of Square and Enix into Square Enix, then-CEO Yoichi Wada decided that the company could tap into fan demands for continuations of the story of Final Fantasy VII.

The first title to be conceived was Advent Children, originally envisioned as a short film presentation created by Visual Works, the animation studio behind CGI cutscenes for the company's games. Early in pre-production, plans to make Advent Children a video game rather than a film were considered, but due to several factors including Visual Works' lack of experience with actual game production, it remained a film. One of the main conditions for the project's launch was to reunite the original staff members of Final Fantasy VII: Nojima, art director Yusuke Naora and composer Nobuo Uematsu. After Advent Children began development, it was decided by the team that one title was not enough to fully explore the VII universe. In response, Before Crisis, Dirge of Cerberus and Crisis Core were conceived so as to embrace more aspects of the world and characters. Nomura himself was surprised at the creation of the games, having originally assumed that the film would be the sole product of the project.

Development
Each title had a different impetus fueling its creation and development: Before Crisis was thought up by Hajime Tabata, a new employee at Square Enix's mobile division, when asked by Nomura to create a video game featuring the Turks. Dirge of Cerberus was inspired by Vincent's choice of weapon, Kitase's love of first-person shooters, and the challenge it would provide developers. Prior to the series solidification and the release of Advent Children and Before Crisis, the team had considered other gun-wielding Final Fantasy protagonists for such a game. Crisis Core originated simply as either a Final Fantasy spin-off or a port of Before Crisis for the PlayStation Portable, and after talks with Kitase and Nomura, it was decided to make it another title in the Compilation. The creation of Before Crisis after Advent Children began a lettering formula for the series later used by the staff as common abbreviations: 'AC' stood for Advent Children, 'BC' for Before Crisis, 'CC' for Crisis Core and 'DC' for Dirge of Cerberus. The sequence was nearly disrupted when Crisis Cores title was considered as Before Crisis Core, but the "Before" part of the title was soon dropped, coincidentally creating the sequence.

Before Crisis began development in 2002. The Compilation was first unveiled in 2003 with the announcement of Advent Children. None of the titles in the series up to that point were traditional role-playing games like the original. The explanation for this was that traditional RPGs took long production periods and a large staff, which would have made the project stand out a bit too much. One of the other considerations for the team was not to make the titles lightweight as X-2 had been, due to backlash from parts of the fanbase. Conversely, making Final Fantasy X-2 reminded the team that they did not need to stick to completely serious traditional RPGs, enabling the original creation of the Compilation. While Advent Children was the first Compilation title to begin production, it ran into problems during post-production, resulting in the first released title being Before Crisis, despite it being the second title to begin development. Before Crisis was also originally planned for release in North America, but the mobile phones available in North America at the time were not able to handle the game. In addition, the producer Kosei Ito left Square Enix in 2008 and Tabata moved on to other projects, leaving its localization unlikely. Japanese animation studio Madhouse created a commercial to promote Before Crisis. Due to its success and staff feelings that important scenes from VII represented in Advent Children had been needlessly disjointed, the studio was chosen to produce an animated film: this eventually became Last Order. Crisis Core was originally going to be an action game, but became an action RPG, staying within the staff's design strengths while incorporating action elements.

Wada had stated in 2006, while the development and release of Compilation titles was still ongoing, that the Compilation could remain an active franchise until 2017, the twentieth anniversary of Final Fantasy VIIs release. After finishing work on Advent Children Complete, the team announced that they would take a break from the series, although they said that they still had various ideas for future titles. In later interviews relating to Final Fantasy VII, multiple staff members including Nomura stated that the Compilation was only ever intended to extend to three games and a movie, ending with the release of Crisis Core. Their reasoning was that releasing any more would saturate the market.

Reception

Compared to the original VII, which received near-universal critical acclaim and later cult status as a classic game, the entries in the Compilation have often garnered a mixed reception, and the Compilation as a whole has been critiqued by some. In July 2007, Edge magazine wrote that the titles "could be of a high quality, but there is also a perversion of the original". RPG Site's Alex Donaldson, during a review for Crisis Core, said that the Compilation was "too far detached from the lore of Final Fantasy VII". While critiquing Advent Children and Dirge of Cerberus, and faulting Before Crisiss lack of the original game's characters, he felt that Crisis Core was the Compilations "first classic [Final Fantasy VII] spin-off". RPGFans Stephen Meyerink said that the Compilation titles prior to Crisis Core had "expanded, extended, and retconned [the story] into what some would call an unrecognizable mess". Alexa Ray Corriea, writing for Polygon, was highly critical, saying that few of the Compilation titles were good, and only served to "cheapen the 1997 [PlayStation] original".

Reviews for Advent Children have been mixed to positive: while critics have praised the presentation, graphics and fan appeal, all reviews agree that the story's context and delivery were confusing for people new to the series. While western critics were positive about Last Order, the OAV received heavy fan criticism in Japan due to its retconning of key events, which prompted the team to ensure that the event was faithfully recreated in Crisis Core. Before Crisis, due to remaining in Japan, has received limited attention in the west, but previews have been highly positive, with many praising the gameplay and graphics as being impressive for a mobile game. Opinions for Dirge of Cerberus were decidedly mixed. While many praised the story and characters, especially the focus on Vincent's character and development, critics were mixed to negative about the graphics and gameplay. Japanese magazine Famitsu notably gave the game a delayed and highly critical review. Crisis Core was generally praised, with many enjoying the story's intimate presentation of the characters and action-oriented gameplay, despite some criticism for it being aimed at fans of VII. Critics of the Compilation have generally cited Crisis Core as the best title of the series.

The Final Fantasy VII remake had the highest average score in Metacritic, an 88/100. Tom Marks of IGN calls the game a "complete reinvention", praising the combat system, its "story fleshed out with real emotional arcs" and its nostalgic feel, but criticized the game for having filler and sometimes convoluted new plot points and side missions. He opined that "Final Fantasy VII Remake'''s dull filler and convoluted additions can cause it to stumble, but it still breathes exciting new life into a classic while standing as a great RPG all its own". Nahila Bonfiglio of The Daily Dot states that the "game's neo-noir, Blade Runner-esque setting perfectly marries with its gritty but heartfelt tone". She adds that it is matched by "the exquisite level design with seamless mechanics, addicting gameplay and rousing battles, and you have a recipe for perhaps one of the best games of the year". Both IGN and GameSpot enjoyed the handling of Cloud due to his notable character arc despite starting as anti-hero.

Sales
Many of the titles have received strong sales. Through 2006, Advent Children met with high sales, with 1 million units sold in Japan, 1.3 million in North America, and 100,000 in Europe, making a total of 2.4 million copies sold worldwide. The original version went on to sell four million copies worldwide by 2009. Advent Children Complete also met with strong sales, selling 100,000 copies on its first day of release in Japan. Advent Children Complete was cited as a reason for the increase in sales of the PlayStation 3 console. Before Crisis registered 200,000 users on launch day, making it the best-selling mobile game up until that time, and was accessed 1.6 million times by June 2006. Dirge of Cerberus shipped 392,000 units in its first week, and went on to sell 460,000 units in North America and 270,000 units in Europe. Crisis Core sold 350,000 copies in Japan on its release date, while it sold 301,600 copies in its first month of release in the United States. It went on to sell 2.1 million units worldwide.

Legacy
The process of thought behind the Compilation would later inspire the creation of Fabula Nova Crystallis Final Fantasy, a subseries of games linked by a common mythos, and would use lessons learned from the Compilation production process. On an individual level, Before Crisiss popularity would inspire the creation of another mobile title within the Fabula Nova Crystallis subseries: originally titled Final Fantasy Agito XIII, it would later change platforms and be renamed Final Fantasy Type-0. The battle sequences in Advent Children also served as inspiration for Motomu Toriyama when creating the battle system for Final Fantasy XIII. Former staff members have blamed the Compilation, in conjunction with other extensions of titles like Final Fantasy X, for undermining the series' market presence and fan trust in the West.

Worldwide, the remake shipped and sold over 3.5 million copies within three days. This made it one of the biggest launches for a PlayStation 4 game and the fastest-selling PS4 exclusive in history, surpassing the launch sales of the two previous record holders, Marvel's Spider-Man (3.3 million) and God of War'' (3.1 million).

Further reading

References

 
Cyberpunk video games
Dystopian video games
Final Fantasy spin-offs
Post-apocalyptic video games
Square Enix franchises
Steampunk video games
Transmedia storytelling
Video game franchises
Video games set on fictional planets